Arthur Goodhart Altschul (April 6, 1920 – March 17, 2002) was an American banker and a Goldman Sachs Group partner, and executive at his private family office, Overbrook Management Corporation, founded by his father.

Early life
Altschul was born in 1920 in Manhattan to Helen Lehman Goodhart (maternal granddaughter of Mayer Lehman, one of the three founding brothers of Lehman brothers) and Frank Altschul. He graduated from Deerfield Academy in Massachusetts and in 1943 from Yale College.

Career
He served in the Marines from 1943 through 1945 and was a reporter for The New York Times in the late 1940s.

He worked as an analyst with Lehman Brothers, then joined General American Investors Company and then Goldman Sachs where he served as a general partner from 1959 to 1977 and a limited partner from 1977 to 1999. He was also chairman of General American Investors from 1961 to 1995.

He led the private family office, Overbrook Management Corporation, founded by his father to manage and protect the wealth and financial well-being of the Altschul Family. In 2002, the office opened to provides asset management and related services to institutional investors and high net worth individuals. Over the years, Overbrook's leadership passed to him, and then to the third generation, his son, Arthur Goodhart Altschul, Jr, who currently serves as Overbrook's Chairman.

Philanthropy
Altschul was on the Board of Trustees of many museums and philanthropic organisations, including the Whitney Museum, the United Jewish Appeal, the Overbrook Foundation, the Metropolitan Museum of Art, The American Assembly, and the International Foundation for Art Research.

Barnard College at its 1984 commencement ceremonies awarded Altschul its highest honor, the Barnard Medal of Distinction.

Personal life
Arthur Altschul married four times:
Stephanie Rosemary Wagner (married 1956), who died in a plane crash in 1961. They had two children:
Stephen Altschul (born 1957), a mathematician and researcher.
Charles Altschul (born 1958).
Siri von Reis (married 1963; divorced 1972), a botanist. They had three children:
Arthur Altschul, Jr. (born 1964). In 2013, he married Israeli journalist Rula Jebreal.
Emily Helen Altschul (born 1966). In November 2002, she married John Miller, a journalist and former host of 20/20, a weekly news magazine on ABC.
Serena Altschul (born 1970). She has worked as a broadcast journalist for the MTV, CNN and CBS networks.
Diana Landreth Childs (marriage ended by divorce).
Patricia Dey (married 1996).

References

1920 births
2002 deaths
People from Manhattan
20th-century American businesspeople
American people of German-Jewish descent
Lehman family
Yale College alumni
Deerfield Academy alumni
United States Marine Corps personnel of World War II